Gounsa is a head temple of the Jogye Order of Korean Buddhism.  It stands in Danchon-myeon, Uiseong County, in the province of Gyeongsangbuk-do, South Korea.  The temple was built in 681 C.E. by Uisang, a leading Buddhist monk of Silla.  The name means "lonely cloud"; these characters were chosen after the temple was visited by scholar Choe Chi-won. The temple had previously been known by the same name, but with the meaning of "high cloud."

Gounsa served as a center of uibyeong resistance in the Seven Year War, when it was one of few temples to escape being burned by the Japanese forces.  The temple did burn in a catastrophic fire in 1835; thus, all current buildings date from the 19th or 20th century.

See also
Korean Buddhist temples
Religion in South Korea

External links

Official site, in Korean
Asian Historical Architecture: Gounsa Temple

681 establishments
Religious organizations established in the 7th century
Buddhist temples in South Korea
Buildings and structures in North Gyeongsang Province
Uiseong County
Tourist attractions in North Gyeongsang Province